Ophiusa olista  is a moth of the family Erebidae first described by Charles Swinhoe in 1893. It is found in China, Thailand and Japan.

The wingspan is 46–48 mm.

References

External links

Ophiusa
Moths of Asia
Moths of Japan
Moths described in 1893